AS Sogara is a Gabonese football club based in Port-Gentil.

Honours
African Cup Winners' Cup: 0
Runners-up (1): 1986

Gabonese Championship: 6
1984, 1989, 1991, 1992, 1993, 1994

Gabonese Cup: 1
1985
Runners-up (1): 1984

Gabonese Supercup: 0
Runners-up (1): 1994

External links
AS Sogara at Foot-Palmares.com 

Sogara